Sailor tattoos are traditions of tattooing among sailors, including images with symbolic meanings. These practices date back to at least the 16th century among European sailors, and since colonial times among American sailors. People participating in these traditions have included military service members in national navies, seafarers in whaling and fishing fleets, and civilian mariners on merchant ships and research vessels. Sailor tattoos have served as protective talismans in sailors' superstitions, records of important experiences, markers of identity, and means of self-expression. Common symbols include swallows, nautical stars, and anchors.

For centuries, tattooing among sailors mostly happened during downtime at sea, applied by hand with needles and tattoo ink made with simple pigments such as soot and gunpowder. These tattoo artists informally developed a graphical vocabulary including nautical images such as mermaids and ships. Starting around the 1870s, a few former sailors began opening professional tattoo parlors in port cities in the United States and England, especially after the development of the electric tattoo machine in the 1890s.

In the United States, these former sailors trained a larger generation of professional tattoo artists. They developed the American traditional ("old school") tattoo style derived from sailor practices, informed by styles and techniques learned from Japanese tattoo artists. "Sailor tattoos" can also refer to this style of tattoo, inspired by traditional sailor motifs, that was popularized for a broader audience starting in the 1950s.

There are records of significant numbers of tattoos among US Navy sailors in the American Revolution, Civil War, and World War II. Many sea service members continue to participate in the tradition.

History

Origin 

While tattoo, from the Polynesian root "tatau," only entered English and other European languages in the late 18th century, European sailors have practiced tattooing since at least the 16th century.

The development of an "identifiable tattooing tradition" among sailors may be an extension of their "choice of social self-demarcation through distinctive dress and accessories." Tattoos are also practical: they help to identify the body of a drowned sailor.

18th century 

American and English sailors around 1700-1750 used gunpowder or ink to create tattoos by pricking the skin and rubbing the powder into the wound. For example, in the 1720s-1730s in Virginia and Maryland, there are multiple mentions in newspapers of sailors who had blue markings on their arms, including initials and crucifixes, made with gunpowder.

There is a persistent myth that tattoos on European sailors originated with Captain James Cook's crew, who were tattooed in Tahiti in 1769, but Cook brought only the word tattoo to Europeans, not the practice itself. Maritime historian Ira Dye writes that "the tattooing of American (and by strong inference, European) seafarers was a common and well-established practice at the time of Cook's voyages."

Scholars debate whether Cook's voyages themselves markedly increased the popularity of tattooing among sailors, or whether the rise of print culture and surveillance-based recordkeeping that happened around the same time made tattoos more visible in the historical record.

Following the American Revolution, American sailors' tattoos were listed in their protection papers, an identity certificate issued to prevent impressment into the British Royal Navy.

The Naval History and Heritage Command says that "by the late 18th century, around a third of British and a fifth of American sailors had at least one tattoo."

19th century 

Sailor tattoo motifs had already solidified by the early 19th century, with anchors, ships, and other nautical symbols being the most common images tattooed on American seafarers, followed by patriotic symbols such as flags, eagles, and stars; symbols of love; and religious symbols.

It was common for sailors to bring toolboxes of needles and inks aboard ships to tattoo each other at sea. Herman Melville, who served in the United States Navy in 1843-4, recounts:

A letter from a sailor serving aboard the USS Monitor during the American Civil War describes his "old salt" shipmates as significantly tattooed:

Personnel records from the USS Adams from 1884 to 1889 show that 17.5% of its crew had tattoos. Rates of tattooing varied between the occupational groups aboard the ship, with 28.9% of men who actually sailed the ship having tattoos, compared with only 4% of men who provided specialized services, such as apothecaries and carpenters.

While French and Italian criminologists linked tattoos to criminality, tattooing was "sufficiently normalized that it attracted virtually no official or scholarly attention" among British criminologists. By the late 19th century, tattoos were common among officers as well as enlisted men in the Royal Navy, whereas tattoos among French and Italian officers were less common. American naval officers were also tattooed, usually while serving in the western Pacific.

Tattooed sailors were a "minor trope" of Victorian literature; in A Study in Scarlet (1887), Sherlock Holmes is able to identify a retired Marine on the basis of an anchor tattoo that "smack[s] of the sea."

In the late 19th century, tattooing among sailors began to shift from a pastime on ships to professional shops in port cities. In the early 1870s, Martin Hildebrandt, who had learned tattooing from a fellow sailor in the US Navy, opened one of the first tattoo parlors in the United States. The development of electric tattoo machines in the 1890s enabled faster and more precise tattooing. To fulfill increased demand for tattoos, artists began to buy and sell sets of pre-drawn designs (flash), especially simple designs with black outlines and limited colors to enable quick work.

20th century

Early 20th century 

In records from 1900–1908, among the more than 3,500 sailors who passed through the USS Independence, 23% of first-time enlistees in the United States Navy were already tattooed, and an estimated 60% of "old timers" (sailors who had served more than ten years) had at least one tattoo. The common images were, in order of popularity: coats of arms, flags, anchors, eagles and birds, stars, female figures, ships, clasped hands, daggers, crosses, bracelets, and hearts. Comparative records show that sailors acquired tattoos more frequently than Marines or soldiers.

In 1908, anthropologist A. T. Sinclair, who examined "many hundreds" of sailors, reported that 90% of American man-of-war men and deep-water sailors were tattooed, along with slightly smaller majorities of merchant marines and sailors on coastal trading vessels, compared with only 10% of New England fishermen. Sinclair reported that 90% of "Scandinavian (Sweden, Norway, and Denmark) deep-water sailors" were tattooed, whereas "other Scandinavians never use the practice." 

Some sailors and service members became professional tattoo artists. Amund Dietzel learned to tattoo as a sailor on Norwegian merchant ships in about 1905-1906. He opened a tattoo shop in the United States in 1913 or 1914 and became an influential tattoo artist who worked on many sailors and soldiers. Ben Corday worked on a sailing ship and in the Royal Marines, became a United States citizen in 1912, and worked as a tattoo artist and flash designer. England had prominent tattoo artists in the early 1900s, including George Burchett, Sutherland Macdonald, and Tom Riley, who had served in the Royal Navy or British Army.

By 1914, the US Navy had started discouraging risqué tattoos, so, to avoid being disqualified from service, sailors sometimes had a tattoo artist "dress" their tattoos of nude women.

World War II 

There are estimates that more than 65% of US Navy sailors had a tattoo during World War II. A study of Honolulu, Hawaii, in 1943 found that 65% of customers visiting the city's tattoo shops were non-commissioned Navy personnel, 25% were enlisted Army personnel, and the remaining 10% were defense workers. All of the shops used electrical tattooing machines. 

Sailors continued to use tattoos for identification in World War II, with Social Security or service numbers being tattooed for $1.50.

Growth in popularity among non-sailors 
A specific style of "old school" tattoos became popular among sailors in the 1930s-1940s, with traditional symbols and other maritime-inspired images in simple black lines with color touches. This style was further popularized in subsequent decades, including for people who weren't sailors, through the work of prolific tattoo artists including Norman Collins (known as Sailor Jerry) in Honolulu, and Lyle Tuttle in San Francisco, California. In particular, Collins reworked 1920-30s designs with influences from Japanese artists, creating stylized images that appealed to a wider audience in the 1950s-60s.

This pattern was also happening in Canada; in the 1950s-60s, three tattoo artists were working in port cities and near a Navy base, and they had mostly served sailors but were getting other customers who wanted sailor-style tattoos.

In 1995, artists at Bert Grimm's tattoo studio in Long Beach, California, near the Long Beach Naval Shipyard that was scheduled to close in 1997, spoke about a decline in customers — including that fewer sailors seemed interested in getting traditional tattoos that marked them as Navy "lifers", and that the Navy was discouraging tattoos.This style remained popular among tattoo artists, and in the 1990s and 2000s, artists such as Don Ed Hardy promoted a revival. Hardy had been trained by a tattoo artist, Samuel Steward, who learned from Dietzel and had some of Dietzel's flash in his shop. In 1995, Hardy published a book that supported renewed public interest in older designs, Flash from the Past: Classic American Tattoo Designs 1890-1965. In 1999, Hardy, Steven Grasse, and Michael Malone started Sailor Jerry Ltd. to use Collins' flash designs on products including Sailor Jerry Rum. Hardy started licensing his own tattoo-inspired art for a line of clothing in the early 2000s, and many other products have been sold under his brand. This themed merchandise contributed to the popularity of these tattoos among the general public.

21st century

Military 
In 2016 the US Navy issued more liberal policies on tattoos, allowing sailors to have tattoos below the knee and on the forearms and hands, as well as tattoos up to one inch by one inch on the neck including behind the ear. Sailors with visible tattoos became eligible for recruiting duty and training recruits at boot camp. The US Coast Guard changed its policies in 2013 and 2016 to allow arm and hand tattoos as well, to support recruiting efforts. In 2020, the US Navy discussed potentially opening tattoo parlors on bases, as part of Navy Exchange shops and services.

Sailors in the Royal Australian Navy have incorporated symbolic tattoos as part of their nautical traditions.

In 2017, the Royal New Zealand Navy gave its first approval to an active sailor to receive a traditional Māori tā moko. Since then, more people have received moko while in Navy service.

General population 
In the 2010s, "retro" sailor-style tattoos continued to be popular. One tattoo artist in London said "People don't want the tattoos their dad had, they want the tattoos their granddad had", referring to 1940s-50s crests and traditional sailor motifs. Discussing the pattern of people continuing to get new tattoos of old flash designs, many derived from sailor motifs, historian Matt Lodder wrote:To tattoo a tall ship on a sailor in 1920 was a reasonable, and perhaps inevitable undertaking; to tattoo such a ship on a millennial suburbanite is, like Menard’s Quixote, ‘almost infinitely richer’; though identical in form it is buoyed by several centuries of accumulated cultural resonance, to which the very act of repetition only adds.

Traditions

Protection 
Tattoos have reflected sailors' superstitions, including the belief that certain symbols and talismans could help them. Sailors believed that a nautical star or compass rose would help them navigate, including finding their way back to port or back home. A pig and a hen, usually tattooed on each foot (pig on the left, chicken on the right), were wards against drowning in a shipwreck. Pigs and chickens were said to survive wrecks because their wooden cages kept them afloat. This superstition dates back to at least the late 19th century. "Hold Fast" across the knuckles was a charm to help deckhands and boatswain’s mates keep a firm grip on the rigging.

Religious tattoos such as crucifixes have also served as protective symbols for sailors. Crosses on feet were meant to prevent shark attacks if thrown overboard.

Experiences and achievements 
Tattoos have served as records of important experiences such as travels, achievements, naval hierarchy, rank, status, membership, and other significant events.

Sailors traditionally received a swallow tattoo for traveling , and a second for traveling , often on either side of the chest. The bird is typically a barn swallow, reflecting that these birds migrate far from home and back again. A person may choose a sparrow instead.

A fully-rigged ship often represented traversal of Cape Horn, an important trade route that was especially dangerous. A clipper ship may be labeled "Homeward" or "Homeward Bound" as a reference to adventure and return.

An anchor historically indicated sailing across the Atlantic; it can represent that a sailor has achieved the rank of a leader or has spent a long time at sea, or it may be a first tattoo as a sailor. Crossed anchors between the thumb and forefinger signified a boatswain's mate, and crossed cannons have represented military naval service. A rope around the wrist represents a sailor who is or was a deckhand, and a harpoon signified a member of a whaling or fishing fleet.People may get tattoos to mark their participation in line-crossing ceremonies. A shellback or King Neptune reflects crossing the equator, and a golden dragon means a sailor has crossed the International Date Line (Domain of the Golden Dragon). A golden shellback represents having crossed the equator and international date line at the same time.

A dragon originally indicated that a sailor had served in China, and it later represented service in the Western Pacific Ocean in general. A hula girl or palm tree reflected being stationed in Hawaii or sailing there.

Footnotes

References 

Tattooing traditions
United States Navy traditions
Maritime folklore
Maritime history